This article lists the governors-general of Italian East Africa, a colony of the Italian Empire from 1936 to 1941.

The Governor-General of Italian East Africa was also Viceroy of Italian Ethiopia.

List

See also
Italian East Africa
List of governors of the governorates of Italian East Africa
Italian Ethiopia
Italian Eritrea
List of colonial governors of Italian Eritrea
Italian Somaliland
List of colonial governors of Italian Somaliland
History of Ethiopia
History of Eritrea
History of Somalia
Second Italo-Ethiopian War
East African campaign (World War II)
Arbegnoch
Italian guerrilla war in Ethiopia

Footnotes

References

External links
World Statesmen – Ethiopia

East Africa
 
Ethiopia history-related lists
Eritrea history-related lists
Somalia history-related lists
Italian Empire-related lists